Alex Harvey is an American filmmaker, theater director, writer, producer, and musician based in Cortlandt, New York. He has directed several films, including Walden: Life in the Woods which screened at numerous festivals in 2017 and 2018 and was released on digital platforms in October 2019. He has also directed numerous regional theater productions including Underneath the Lintel and I Am My Own Wife. Harvey also played mandolin in GEICO's nationwide "Happier than" ad campaign.

Early life and education

Alex Harvey was born and raised in Denver, Colorado. He attended Graland Country Day School there as a child and East High School as a teenager. He ultimately graduated high school from Colorado Academy in 1999. Growing up, he acted in numerous high school and community theater productions. After high school, he attended Northwestern University, earning degrees in directing and ethnomusicology. He also directed stage productions while at Northwestern.

Career

Theatre director

One of Harvey's first professional stage credits after graduating from Northwestern was as the director of General Desdemona, which was staged during the Edinburgh Festival Fringe in August 2004. Harvey later relocated to New York City. In 2007, he directed a production of I Am My Own Wife which was staged in both Des Moines, Iowa (at the Civic Center of Greater Des Moines) and Houston, Texas (at the Stages Repertory Theatre). This would lead to him directing several other plays in the Houston area in 2008, including Underneath the Lintel (Alley Theatre) and Mr. Marmalade (Stages).
 
In 2009, when Harvey was the artist-in-residence at the University of California, Berkeley's Arts Research Center, he co-wrote an operatic adaptation of Michael Pollan's 2001 book, The Botany of Desire. He worked with both Pollan and fellow artist-in-residence John Gromada to devise the musical. A reading of the adaptation was performed at Berkeley in April 2009. In March 2010, Harvey directed the students of the American Conservatory Theater's MFA program in a production of O Lovely Glowworm, or Scenes of Great Beauty at San Francisco's Zeum Theater.
 
In January 2011, Harvey returned to the Stages Repertory Theater in Houston where he directed a production of Oh, the Humanity. Later that year, he co-directed (with Melissa Kievman and Brian Mertes) a production of Balm in Gilead, which was staged for one night in an empty warehouse in Industry City in Brooklyn's Sunset Park neighborhood.
 
In August 2013, Harvey directed Waiting for Waiting for Godot which was staged during the New York International Fringe Festival. It went on to be honored with the Overall Excellence Award by the festival and was given a brief extended run of three nights the following month. Throughout this time, Harvey taught at New York University's Tisch School of the Arts, directing and writing productions for graduate students including stagings of an adaptation of Vladimir Nabokov's Pale Fire and an adaptation of Henrik Ibsen's Peer Gynt called Peer@Me.

Musician

Beginning in 2012, Harvey started appearing in a variety of GEICO insurance ads for the nationwide "Happier than" campaign in which he played the mandolin. He would later appear as the featured mandolin and tenor guitar player on the Michael Cerveris & Loose Cattle album, North of Houston (2014), and other subsequent recordings.

Filmmaker

In 2016, Harvey began filming for Walden: Life in the Woods supported in part by an incentive grant from the Colorado Economic Development Commission. Walden is loosely based on the Henry David Thoreau book of the same name. Harvey had been devising the film with a group of other Colorado natives as far back as 2009. Demián Bichir and T.J. Miller were added to the cast in August 2016. The film was shot and set entirely in Colorado and had its premiere at the Denver Film Festival in November 2017. It went on to appear at numerous film festivals in 2017 and 2018 including the Whistler Film Festival, RiverRun International Film Festival, and Oaxaca FilmFest. It received a wide release on various digital platforms in October 2019.
 
Harvey also co-directed (with director Brian Mertes) the film, I Am a Seagull, a hybrid narrative film and documentary that follows the Lake Lucille Chekhov Project as it stages its annual production of Anton Chekhov's The Seagull. It premiered in March 2018 in New York City. Harvey also directed a black-and-white silent film called, The Unsilent Picture, which stars Bill Irwin. It was screened throughout October 2018 in a tent theater at the Philipsburg Manor in Sleepy Hollow, New York, and each showing was accompanied by a live soundtrack.

Credits

Film

Theatre

References

 

Year of birth missing (living people)
Living people
Northwestern University alumni
American theatre directors